WYHL (1450 AM) is a sports radio station in Meridian, Mississippi, owned by Mississippi Broadcasters, LLC.

History
The station was first licensed in 1947 as WTOK, owned by the Meridian Broadcasting Company. It changed its call sign to WOKK on April 1, 1957, after being sold to the New South Broadcasting Corporation by the Southern Television Corporation (which retained WTOK-TV); to WQIC on October 15, 1973, after a sale to Torgerson Broadcasting Company; to WMDN on April 13, 1987; back to WQIC on February 9, 1990; to WMGP on September 20, 1991; to WFFX on August 16, 1996; and to WYHL on March 23, 2007.

As of September 26, 2016, WYHL is now being heard on W259BP 99.7 FM in Meridian.  (Info taken from Radio-Locator and fccdata.org)

As of January 17, 2017, WYHL changed format from gospel to sports, with programming from Fox Sports Radio. (info taken from stationintel.com)

References

External links

YHL
Lauderdale County, Mississippi
Fox Sports Radio stations
Radio stations established in 1947
1947 establishments in Mississippi